Par Pacific Holdings is a Houston-based American oil and gas exploration and production company. Known as Par Petroleum Corporation after it emerged from bankruptcy, it was renamed Par Pacific Holdings on October 20, 2015.  it was a Fortune 1000 corporation.

Par Pacific Holdings, Inc., a company whose headquarters are in Houston, Texas, owns operations in oil and production and midstream operations. Par Pacific owns the largest operating refinery in Hawaii which has a 94,000-bpd capacity, this distributes to 90 proprietary and additional independent retail locations under the Hele and 76 brands. In Wyoming, Par Pacific owns a refinery and pipelines which bring crude oil and distributes refined products. Par Pacific also owns 42.3% of Laramie Energy, LLC which has natural gas operations and assets concentrated in the Piceance Basin in Western Colorado.

Hawaii operations
On 19 December 2018, Par Pacific completed the $45 million sale from Island Energy Services (IES) of the 94,000-b/sd crude and vacuum distillation refinery known as Par East at the Campbell Industrial Park in Kapolei, Hawaii, and existing stocks of petroleum products. The Par East refinery at Kapolei is operated by Par Hawaii Refining, Inc., which is led by president Jimmy Yates and is a subsidiary of Par Pacific. Par Pacific expected to hire 20 additional employees along with 65 IES workers. IES will continue to own and maintain the Kapolei offshore mooring terminal and provide logistical support of petroleum products to Hawaii Electric Light Co., Maui Electric Co., Hawaiian Electric Co., and Kauai Island Utility Cooperative. According to IES CEO Jon Mauer in 2018, IES will continue to supply petroleum products to its existing 56 Texaco-branded stations from its current network of local and global suppliers and will bring on line additional stations including a new one in Kapolei.

During 2018, approximately eight cargoes of Minas crude from Riau in Sumatra, Indonesia were shipped to Hawaii through third parties on term offtake agreements with Indonesia's Pertamina or field operator PT Chevron Pacific Indonesia (CPI), but the shipments from Indonesia to the Kapolei Refinery were terminated under Par Pacific in 2019.

In March 2022, the Kapolei Refinery received about a quarter of its crude from Russia's Far East. Following the 8 March 2022 announcement by President Biden of a ban of Russian oil, liquified natural gas, and coal imported into the United States due to the War in Ukraine, Par Pacific announced that it would obtain non-Russian sources for its West Oahu oil refinery. Between August and December 2021, the refinery received one shipment of approximately 700,000 barrels from the Russian Far East. To replace the Russian sources, Par Pacific announced that it would source from North America and South America.

Notes

References

2015 establishments in Texas
Companies based in Houston